Prafulla Govinda Baruah is the owner and managing director of The Assam Tribune. In 2018, he was presented with the Padma Shri (civilian honor) for his contribution to the growth of literature and education in Assam, India.

Personal life 
He is the son of Radha Govinda Baruah, the founder of The Assam Tribune.

Career 
The doyen of journalism in Assam, Prafulla Baruah became the Editor of The Assam Tribune in 1966 and is presently the managing director of The Assam Tribune Group. He is actively involved with various socio-cultural organisations and amateur theatre.

He has received honours from various organisations such as the Kamala Saikia Trust, Asam Sahitya Sabha, and Dr B. Borooah Cancer Institute for creating awareness for cancer.

In 2018, he was conferred the Padma Sri honour by the President of India. On 3 February 2019, doctorate degree was conferred to him at the 3rd convocation of Krishna Kanta Handiqui State Open University (KKSHOU).

References 

Year of birth missing (living people)
Living people
Indian newspaper journalists
Recipients of the Padma Shri in literature & education